Bohnabad (also Romanized as Bohnābād and Buhnābād; also known as Bonābād and Bahmanābād) is a village in Baqeran Rural District, in the Central District of Birjand County, South Khorasan Province, Iran. At the 2006 census, its population was 22, in 6 families.

References 

Populated places in Birjand County